The Caracas Metro is a mass rapid transit system serving Caracas, Venezuela. It was constructed and is operated by Compañía Anónima Metro de Caracas, a government-owned company that was founded in 1977 by José González-Lander who headed the project for more than thirty years since the early planning stages in the 1960s. Its motto is "" (translated as 'We are part of your life'). In 1978 MTA – New York City Transit's R46 #816 (now 5866) was shipped from the Pullman Standard's plant as a sample of rolling stock to be used for the new metro system that was under construction at the time. 

Its purpose is to contribute to the development of collective transportation in Caracas and its immediate area, through the planning, construction, and commercial exploitation of an integrated transportation system. The C. A. Metro de Caracas is in charge of its construction, operation and exploitation as a decentralized public body attached to the Ministry of People's Power for Land Transportation.

As a consequence of the crisis that the country is experiencing, by October 2018 it was estimated that 25% of the Caracas Metro trains were out of service due to lack of maintenance. In 2020, 9 of them remain operational. 48 trains on Line 1; 6 of 44 on Line 2; and 4 of 16 on Line 3; which, together with electrical failures, causes users to experience permanent delays. In 2022, the Caracas Metro only has 23 of the 169 trains operational.

The system has 53 stations. The company is run by Major General Juan Carlos Du Bolay Perozo.

Lines

The Caracas Metro currently has the following lines in operation:

These lines were built between 1978 and 2006. Line 2 has four terminal stations.

Part of Line 2 was constructed as Line 4, but after its inauguration it was renamed Line 2. One must transfer on Line 3 at El Valle station to continue the ride.

Construction of the first phase of Line 4 (now officially renamed Line 2) started in 2001; this line runs parallel to Line 1 to the south, and connects Plaza Venezuela station on Line 1 with Capuchinos station on Line 2. It is expected to provide much needed relief to congestion along this segment of Line 1 where most of Metro's ridership is concentrated.

Commuter rail transfer points

Construction was begun on the Los Teques Metro from Caracas Metro Las Adjuntas station (the expanded station with independent platforms connected by overhead walkways is now common to both metro systems) to the suburban city of Los Teques Alí Primera (formerly called El Tambor) station in 2001 and completed November 3, 2006.

IFE
Line 3 station La Rinconada is the interchange station between the Caracas Metro and the Caracas train station Libertador Simón Bolívar, where connections can be made to and from Charallave and Cúa.

Guarenas/Guatire Metro
The Guarenas / Guatire Metro is a new line with the intention of providing access to the eastern suburban communities. Both subsystems would allow for transfers at the Guaraira Repano (Petare North) station. In December 2006, the government awarded a 2 billion dollar contract for the construction of the new line between a soon-to-be-built Caracas Metro Parque del Este II station and the nearby twin cities of Guarenas/Guatire, with completion set for July 2012. However, by November 2012, only 7% of the metro project had been completed, and the completion date had slipped to at least 2016. , there is no official opening date.

Services

Metrobus
The system possesses a complementary bus transit network called the Metrobus, which covers 20 urban routes and four suburban routes, with the aim of transporting users to other popular destinations in the Greater Caracas area that are not reached by the metro, including bedroom communities close to the city.

External ticket sale
A modality implanted by the enterprise is the wholesale of tickets used in the Metro and in the Metrobús. A number of tickets is sold to some middlemen, and from there to authorized points of sale, such as kiosks and other commercial establishments. This allows Metro users to buy tickets outside of the stations, thus making them more widely available. The points of sale formally authorized for these operations are identified with the Metroseñal (Metro-sign). Tickets sold at such locals have a price discount of 3%.

Fares and types of tickets
The values for tickets depend mostly on the number of travels the user has planned. There are also special prices for students, and fares differ for the Metrobús usage. The types of tickets and their pricings are listed below.

In 2018, the metro became free to ride. While Metro de Caracas said this was because of a passenger number assessment, workers revealed that the government had not given the company hard money for over a year, and they could not import paper to print tickets, necessitating unlocked turnstiles.

Future expansions

The next phases of the Line 2 extension (also known as Line 5 during construction phase) were to be constructed with an opening planned for 2012. The first project, a  extension, includes six new stations in Bello Monte, Las Mercedes, Tamanaco, Chuao, Bello Campo and Parque del Este II station. A separate project was to be carried out simultaneously, an additional  Line 2 extension (also known as Line 5 or Metro Guarenas-Guatire Urban Route during the construction phase) with four additional stations in Montecristo, Boleíta, El Marques and terminal/transfer station La Urbina (Petare Norte).

The La Urbina station was also destined to be the Caracas Guarenas-Guatire light rail transfer point.

Long term proposals include expanding the system with two more lines: Line 5 ( long) to southeast Caracas, and Line 6 that would run parallel to Line 1 to the north.

Incidents
On July 30, 2007, after 24 years without a single accident, a collision took place that took the life of 1 person and injured 11 others. It was on Line 1 at Plaza Sucre station at 9:09 a.m. when a train headed in the Propatria direction stopped on the platform. It was hit from behind by another travelling in the same direction. Although there has been much speculation about the cause of the accident, it is clear that there was a defect in the emergency braking system; the operational control centre from the La Hoyada station never activated the automatic braking mechanism when a train approaches a second train.
On November 12, 2010, 33 people were arrested after staging a protest at Propatria Station over increasingly deteriorating service on the Metro.
 On 23 January 2017, several thousand Venezuelans protested throughout the country the government had also cordoned of the planned march areas with police and closed all subway and transportation systems to the area.
 During the 2017 protests, it was common for the government to close Metro stations. On 4 April, twelve subway stations were closed; on 8 April, 16 subway stations and 19 Caracas Metrobus routes were closed. On 13 April, 27 stations were closed, and on 26 April the Metro was closed completely after being open for two hours, along with the suspension of the Metrobus and Bus Caracas services.
 On 5 February 2018, after a protests because of the delay of the Metro, tear gas was fired in the subway, causing the service to be suspended for 25 minutes.
 On 14 February 2018, Metro users had to walk across the subway tunnels after an electric failure.
In July 2018, the Metro stopped issuing tickets as they ran out of paper for printing the tickets.
In October 2018, it was announced that 25% of Caracas Metro trains were out of service due to a lack of maintenance.
In March 2019, the metro was out of service for several days due to an energy blackout caused by the poor political and economic situation in the country.

Network map

See also
 List of Caracas Metro stations
 List of Latin American rail transit systems by ridership
 List of metro systems

Notes

References

External links

Metro de Caracas, C.A. – official website  
Caracas Metro track map 
Caracas (Metro) at UrbanRail.net
Allen Morrison Early Tramway systems in Caracas

 
Railway companies established in 1977